Eustoma russellianum is a species of flowering plant in the gentian family. Its previous binomial name was Eustoma grandiflorum. Common names include Texas bluebells, Texas bluebell, bluebell, showy prairie gentian, prairie gentian, and Lisianthus.

There is a cultivar, 'Bolero Deep Blue'.

Description
Eustoma russellianum has blue-green waxy leaves and showy bell shaped flowers in blue pink or white each borne singly on an upright plant. Depending on where it grows it may present as an annual, biennial or perennial plant.

Distribution and habitat
It is found primarily in the Great Plains region of North America, from Wyoming southeast to Nebraska, and south to Texas and Mexico.  Due to its popularity and the frequency it's picked, it has been unable to naturally reseed itself in its native distribution.

It prefers moist, sandy soils and often grows near streams or creek-beds.

Cultivation
Texas bluebell is a popular garden flower, and has been cultivated in Japan for over 70 years. Many varieties, including those with double petals, or a variety of colored flowers, have been developed.

Diseases

Viral and viroid diseases

References

Common Names of Diseases, The American Phytopathological Society

Gentianaceae
Endemic flora of the United States
Flora of the United States